Wrestlicious was an American women's professional wrestling promotion based in Tampa, Florida. The company was founded by Jonathan Vargas, who won a Powerball jackpot of $35.3 million in 2008. It was known for its sketch comedy and has been often compared to Gorgeous Ladies of Wrestling. In 2011, Bleacher Report ranked Wrestlicious No. 11 on its list of the 25 worst wrestling promotions.

History
Former Gorgeous Ladies of Wrestling host and producer Johnny Cafarella and Jimmy Hart partnered with Jonathan Vargas. In March 2009, a trailer was released promoting Wrestlicious. Originally rumored as airing on Fox Network in fall 2009, the Wrestlicious Takedown series eventually aired in syndication beginning in March 2010. Throughout 2010, Wrestlicious signed several new wrestlers (to replace many of the women that had worked for them during the original 2008 tapings and were now unavailable), and then taped new matches beginning in May 2010 to air on Takedown. However, no new content has been made since.

Wrestlicious TakeDown
Wrestlicious TakeDown was the Main Television program produced by Wrestlicious which ran on Dish Network, via MavTV in the United States and BiteTV in Canada, as well as in syndication. The first season consists of 13 episodes. Wrestlicious TakeDown began airing on Monday with its first episode airing on March 1, 2010 However it was announced the following Thursday on March 4, 2010, that the show would be moving to Wednesday. On May 16, 2011, it was announced that Wrestlicious is returning with its employees back to begin a second season, though no second season was ever produced or released.

History
It was announced on March 27, 2010 that Wrestlicious TakeDown will begin airing on many television stations throughout the United States starting around April 1 and May 1, 2010.

Vargas appeared on the show as "JV Rich". Regular features included "JV's CRIB", a look at the goings-on inside JV's mansion frequented by the Wrestlicious girls.

After one season of Wrestlicious stopped production. Several of the talents went on to work for WWE, TNA/IMPACT, and other companies.

Roster

Wrestlers

Other on-air personnel

Stables and Tag Teams

Wrestlicious Championship

References

http://www.diva-dirt.com/124208/exclusive-wrestlicious-tv-series-in-the-works/

External links
Wrestlicious.com

American professional wrestling television series
Independent professional wrestling promotions based in Florida
Women's professional wrestling promotions
2010 American television series debuts
Entertainment companies established in 2009
Companies based in Tampa, Florida
Sports in Tampa, Florida
2009 establishments in Florida